Edward Anthony Bradford (September 17, 1813 – November 22, 1872) was a lawyer and unsuccessful nominee to the United States Supreme Court.

Biography
Born in Plainfield, Connecticut, Bradford graduated from Yale University (1833) and Harvard Law School (1837) before establishing a law practice in New Orleans, Louisiana.

Bradford was nominated by President Millard Fillmore as an Associate Justice of the Supreme Court of the United States on August 16, 1852, to succeed John McKinley. The Senate declined to act on the nomination before the session ended and Bradford was not re-nominated.

Bradford became ill with an unspecified disease in 1869 and left his law practice to seek treatment in Europe. After stays in England and Germany, he died in Paris, France, on November 22, 1872.  He was buried at Plainfield Cemetery in Plainfield, Connecticut.

References

1813 births
1872 deaths
Harvard Law School alumni
Louisiana lawyers
People from Plainfield, Connecticut
Unsuccessful nominees to the United States Supreme Court
Yale University alumni
19th-century American judges
19th-century American lawyers